Choi Si-woo (born 12 November 1996) is a South Korean ice sledge hockey player. He was a member of South Korea's bronze medal winning team in Para ice hockey at the 2018 Winter Paralympics.

References

External links 
 

1996 births
Living people
South Korean sledge hockey players
Paralympic sledge hockey players of South Korea
Paralympic bronze medalists for South Korea
Para ice hockey players at the 2018 Winter Paralympics
Para ice hockey players at the 2022 Winter Paralympics
Medalists at the 2018 Winter Paralympics
Place of birth missing (living people)
Paralympic medalists in sledge hockey
21st-century South Korean people